The 1979 Humboldt State Lumberjacks football team represented Humboldt State University during the 1979 NCAA Division II football season. Humboldt State competed in the Far Western Conference (FWC).

The 1979 Lumberjacks were led by head coach Bud Van Deren in his 14th season. They played home games at the Redwood Bowl in Arcata, California. Humboldt State finished with a record of eight wins and two losses (8–2, 4–1 FWC). The Lumberjacks outscored their opponents 220–127 for the season.

Schedule

Notes

References

Humboldt State
Humboldt State Lumberjacks football seasons
Humboldt State Lumberjacks football